Rob Smith (born 10 November 1961 in Melbourne, Australia) is a former field hockey player from Canada, who competed at the 1984 Summer Olympics in Los Angeles, California. There the resident of North Vancouver, British Columbia finished in tenth place with the Men's National Team.

International senior competitions

 1984 – Olympic Games, Los Angeles (10th)

References
 Canadian Olympic Committee

External links
 

1961 births
Living people
Australian emigrants to Canada
Field hockey people from British Columbia
Canadian male field hockey players
Canadian people of British descent
Field hockey players at the 1984 Summer Olympics
Olympic field hockey players of Canada
Field hockey players from Melbourne
Sportspeople from North Vancouver
Pan American Games medalists in field hockey
Pan American Games gold medalists for Canada
Loughborough Students field hockey players
Field hockey players at the 1983 Pan American Games
Medalists at the 1983 Pan American Games